Pigmentation disorders are disturbances of human skin color. There may be a loss or reduction, which may be related to loss of melanocytes or the inability of melanocytes to produce melanin or transport melanosomes correctly.

Most pigmentation disorders involve the underproduction or overproduction of melanin.

References

External links